Crab Cay or Cayo Cangrejo is a small island in Old Providence McBean Lagoon National Natural Park within the municipality of Providencia and Santa Catalina Islands.

See also

Caribbean Region, Colombia
Providencia and Santa Catalina Islands

References

Caribbean islands of Colombia
Islands of the Archipelago of San Andrés, Providencia and Santa Catalina